Konnect Entertainment (stylized as KONNECT Entertainment) is an independent South Korean entertainment company founded on June 5, 2019 by Kang Daniel. The company is based in the Gangnam District of Seoul in South Korea. As of September 2021, Konnect fully manages solo artists Kang Daniel, Chancellor, and Yuju while domestically managing solo artist CL. It is also home to dance crew We Dem Boyz (WDBZ).

History
Konnect Entertainment was founded on June 5, 2019 as a one-man agency for and by Kang Daniel. The name "Konnect" is a fusion of the words "Korea" and "connect", which reveals his goal to connect Korea to the rest of the world through his future activities.

Immediately after the disbandment of project boy group Wanna One, it was revealed that Kang was in a legal dispute with his former agency due to the transfer of his exclusive contract rights to third parties without his prior consent. This dispute resulted in his six-month hiatus from the entertainment industry until the Seoul Central District Court ruled in his favor, allowing the suspension of his contract. This ruling meant that he could pursue individual entertainment activities without any interference from his former agency. After receiving help from multiple experts as well as his lawyers, Kang established both KD Corporation Ltd. and Konnect Entertainment. A representative from the agency revealed that:

"Kang decided to go in the direction of establishing a one-man agency after considering every possible angle in terms of what agency structure would best suit his long-term activities. His decision was also heavily influenced by the fact that he wanted to return to his fans, who had waited for a long time, as quickly as possible."

During the comeback show for his second EP that aired on Mnet and M2 channels, Kang revealed that his dance team at Konnect Entertainment partially consists of friends that he has known since before his debut. As for KD Corporation Ltd., plans to branch out into various business directions in the future were announced. In February 2020, a cafe on the first floor of Konnect Entertainment's building in the Gangnam District of Seoul called Cafe de Konnect officially opened for business. It held a fan-only event on February 19 and 20 before opening to the public on the following day. The fan event allowed 100 fans to claim a free drink after showing their membership card from Kang's official fancafe on a first-come, first-served basis. In the same month, Kakao Friends released a limited-edition beverage and dessert menu as part of its collaboration line with Kang for three cafes including Cafe de Konnect.

In February 2021, Konnect Entertainment announced that it would launch a mobile application for Kang's official fancafe which had previously been located on the company's official website. The app was released for free for iOS on the Apple App Store and for Android on the Google Play Store on March 30, 2021. This marked the first time an artist in Korea had ever released their own app. Developed by Konnect and titled "Kang Daniel", the social networking service has an automatic translation function with 10 translatable languages including: Korean, English, Simplified Chinese, Traditional Chinese, Japanese, Indonesian, Malay, Spanish, Portuguese, and Thai. In August 2021, it was announced that singer-songwriter and producer Chancellor had signed an exclusive contract with Konnect Entertainment. The agency confirmed this and said "we will spare no effort to support him so that he can showcase his full potential as a producer and artist". Following her departure from Source Music and the disbandment of South Korean girl group GFriend, former member Yuju signed an exclusive contract with Konnect Entertainment in September 2021.

In June 2022, Cafe de Konnect launched a beverage and dessert menu to commemorate the collaboration line between Kang and SpongeBob SquarePants. In the same year, the agency won the APAN K-pop Label Award for "leading the Korean wave" as it promotes the development of K-pop and is active in various fields. Kang, Chancellor, and Yuju each held a special performance at the 2022 APAN Star Awards to commemorate this award as artists of the agency. Following their placement as runner-up on Mnet's Street Man Fighter and their long-standing relationship with the agency as Kang's dance team, dance crew We Dem Boyz (WDBZ) officially signed an exclusive contract with Konnect Entertainment in November 2022. In the same month, they were featured on Kang's lead single "Nirvana" from his repackaged album The Story: Retold.

Partnerships
In July 2019, Sony Music Korea confirmed that it would take charge as both the investor and distributor of Kang's solo debut extended play (EP), Color on Me. Since then, the company has continued distributing Kang's subsequent works including his three-part color series: Cyan, Magenta, and Yellow. In June 2022, he started Japanese activities in partnership with Warner Music Japan.

In April 2021, South Korean game development company Dalcomsoft revealed its next rhythm game app featuring music from Kang Daniel. Developed by Dalcomsoft Inc. and in collaboration with Konnect Entertainment, the app was released on April 29, 2021 for iOS on the Apple App Store and for Android on the Google Play Store. Superstar Kang Daniel is the first version of the app series exclusively made for a solo artist. Two months later, it was announced that CL had signed a domestic management contract with Konnect Entertainment. The agency confirmed that it would be responsible for CL's domestic activities and said "we will actively support CL so that she can carry out her music activities as a top-tier musician". This would work as a partnership agreement between Konnect Entertainment and CL's own label, Very Cherry.

In September 2022, South Korean production company Snowballs revealed its next puzzle game app featuring Kang Daniel as the main character. Developed by Snowballs Inc. and in collaboration with Konnect Entertainment, Starway Kang Daniel was released on September 29, 2022 for iOS on the Apple App Store and for Android on the Google Play Store.

Philanthropy
In December 2019, it was revealed that Konnect Entertainment donated 31,000 briquettes to 31 briquette banks nationwide to thank fans for helping those in need on Kang's birthday. In December 2020, Kang and all of his agency staff participated in the Holt Children's Services (HCS) campaign "Please Protect Me" by handcrafting and delivering 100 book covers to the humanitarian organization. Proceeds from the book cover kits bought by Konnect would be used to provide mental and medical care, housing, living, and educational support to children in need.

Artists

Soloists
 Kang Daniel
 CL (co-managed by Very Cherry)
 Chancellor
 Yuju

Producers
 Chancellor

Actors
 Kang Daniel

Dance crews
 We Dem Boyz (WDBZ)

Discography

2019–present

Accolade

Notes

References

External links
 

Konnect Entertainment
South Korean record labels
South Korean independent record labels
Talent agencies of South Korea
2019 establishments in South Korea
Entertainment companies established in 2019
Companies based in Seoul
K-pop record labels
Record labels established in 2019